Wang Chao (born November 2, 1996) is a Chinese ice dancer.  With his skating partner, Ning Wanqi, he is the 2020 Cup of China bronze medalist, a three-time Chinese national bronze medalist (2018–20), and competed in the final segment at two Four Continents Championships (2019, 2020).

Programs

With Ning

Competitive highlights 
GP: Grand Prix; CS: Challenger Series; JGP: Junior Grand Prix

 With Ning

 Men's singles

References

External links 
 

1996 births
Living people
Chinese male ice dancers
Figure skaters from Heilongjiang
Sportspeople from Qiqihar